The Lost World Museum is a creationist museum, located in Phoenix, New York, in the United States. The museum was established by John Adolfi.

References

External links

Creationist museums in the United States
Museums in Oswego County, New York
Religious museums in New York (state)